Lake Leynar is a lake on the island of Streymoy in the Faroe Islands.

Lake Leynar is the sixth-largest natural lake in the Faroe Islands and it measures . The valley and its contents is administered by the National Trust. The lakeside is the location for the KOKS restaurant.

References

Leynar
Streymoy